The Enemy of the World is the fourth serial of the fifth season of the British science fiction television series Doctor Who, which originally aired in six weekly parts from 23 December 1967 to 27 January 1968.

The serial is set in Australia and Hungary in 2018. In the serial, the time traveller the Second Doctor (Patrick Troughton) and his travelling companions Jamie McCrimmon (Frazer Hines) and Victoria Waterfield (Deborah Watling) work with the spies Giles Kent (Bill Kerr) and Astrid Ferrier (Mary Peach) to expose the Doctor's Mexican doppelgänger Salamander (Troughton) as having created natural disasters on Earth.

The story is a break from the monsters and "base under siege" of season five, highlighted by a dual role for lead actor Patrick Troughton.

For over forty years, only Episode 3 of The Enemy of the World was known to exist in the BBC's film and TV archives, having been saved from being wiped and junked. However, on 11 October 2013, it was announced by the BBC that the other five episodes had been found and were back in their hands again.

Plot
The Second Doctor, Jamie and Victoria are enjoying themselves on a beach in Australia in 2018 when the Doctor is subject to an assassination attempt. The boss of the would-be assassins, an agent named Astrid Ferrier, rescues them by helicopter and takes them to her boss Giles Kent. There, the Doctor learns he is a physical double of Salamander, a ruthless megalomaniac. Kent's home is surrounded by troops led by Security Chief Donald Bruce. The Doctor is persuaded to impersonate Salamander to save his companions and to gather more information. The Doctor's companions infiltrate Salamander's palace in Europe to gather evidence against him.

Jamie and Victoria use their new roles in the palace to get close to Fariah, Salamander's food taster, hoping to gather information. Fariah reveals she was blackmailed into her role. Jamie causes a diversion to try to facilitate an unsuccessful rescue attempt on Denes by Astrid. Denes is shot dead. Though Astrid escapes, Jamie and Victoria are arrested.

Salamander discovers he is being impersonated and returns to his research station to confront the impostor. Fariah tells the Doctor that Jamie and Victoria are prisoners in the Research Centre. Before they can act, the building is raided by Salamander's deputy Benik and his troops. Fariah is killed and the others escape.

It is revealed that Salamander has trapped a group of scientists below the Research Centre and is using their knowledge to create natural disasters in order to destabilise the world and increase his influence.

Bruce and the Doctor have Jamie and Victoria released from the centre, and the Doctor sends them back to the TARDIS. He then goes to the records room, where Kent, believing the Doctor to be Salamander, accidentally reveals that they conspired together to trap the scientists below ground. Astrid arrives, incriminating Kent further as people from the bunker identify him. Kent flees into the cave system beyond the Records Room. There, he encounters the real Salamander, who shoots him in the back. As he falls, Kent sets off a set of explosives that destroy the bunker and damage the research centre.

A shaken and bleeding Salamander takes refuge in the TARDIS, pretending to be the Doctor. The real Doctor arrives, and expresses his intention of turning Salamander to the authorities. Salamander attacks the Doctor, but he fights back with Jamie's help. In a panic, Salamander pulls the dematerialisation switch while the TARDIS doors are still open, and falls out into the time vortex.

Production

This was the last story to be produced under the aegis of Doctor Who creator Sydney Newman, who left his position as Head of Drama at the BBC upon the expiration of his contract at the end of 1967. The four key production roles for this story were all taken by men heavily involved in the development of Doctor Who. Author David Whitaker had been the show's first script editor; Barry Letts, directing the show for the first time, later became the show's producer (for the majority of the Jon Pertwee era), executive producer, and occasional script writer; script editor Peter Bryant became the show's producer from the next story; Innes Lloyd was the show's current producer, but left after this story.

Much like the First Doctor serial The Massacre of St Bartholomew's Eve (1966), this serial was influenced by the lead actor's desire to play roles other than the Doctor. Initially, it was planned that Troughton's two characters would meet more than once, but due to the technical complexity, there was eventually only the one confrontation scene, at the story's climax (utilising editing and a split-screen technique). Barry Letts planned six split-screen shots. He called for a matte box to mask half of the camera lens, having read about the technique used for old Hollywood films. The film was rewound after the first take and Troughton was then filmed in his other costume. However, after the first such shot, the camera jammed, and no more split-screen takes were filmed. Later, Letts mentioned this to Derek Martinus, director of the preceding story, who brought Letts up to date with the contemporary technology of filming normally then using an optical printer to combine the material.

Due to British television's shift from 405-line technology to 625-line, in preparation for colour transmissions, going into effect for all BBC shows from 1 January 1968, it was long believed that the switch-over for Doctor Who from 405 lines to 625 came as of Episode 3 of this serial; however, upon the recovery of the other five episodes of the serial, it was discovered that Episodes 1 and 2 were in fact made at 625 lines prior to the official switchover.<ref>{{cite news|url=https://www.starburstmagazine.com/reviews/dvd-review-doctor-who-the-enemy-of-the-world|title=DVD Review: Doctor Who – "The Enemy of the World|date=18 October 2013|access-date=1 January 2018}}</ref> The now-disproved notion of the switch-over occurring at Episode 3 was most likely due to an error in documentation.

 Recovery of the missing episodes 

Originally, Episode 3 was the only episode of this story to survive in the BBC archives. On 11 October 2013, the BBC announced that the remaining five episodes had been recovered from a television relay station storage room in Nigeria following search efforts by Television International Enterprises Archive and Philip Morris, making the serial complete in the BBC television archives for the first time since the mass junkings of Doctor Who episodes between 1972 and 1978. It was subsequently released on iTunes. It was the second Season 5 serial to be found in its entirety.

Cast notes
Frazer Hines and Deborah Watling did not appear in episode 4, as they were on holiday. Milton Johns would reappear in the Season 13 serial The Android Invasion and the season 15 serial The Invasion of Time.  Colin Douglas would later take a memorable turn as Reuben the lightkeeper (as well as voicing the Rutan scout) in the 15th-season serial Horror of Fang Rock. George Pravda would also reappear in Third Doctor story The Mutants as Jaeger and Fourth Doctor story The Deadly Assassin as Castellan Spandrell.

Commercial releases

In print

A novelisation of this serial, written by Ian Marter, was published by Target Books in March 1981, entitled Doctor Who and the Enemy of the World. David Whitaker had been working on his own version of the novelisation at the time of his death.

Home media
Episode 3 was released on VHS in The Troughton Years. A restored and VidFIREd version was released on DVD in 2004, as part of the Lost in Time boxset. In 2002, a remastered CD version of the audio was released with linking narration by Frazer Hines.

Following the recovery of the remaining episodes, the complete serial was released on iTunes on 11 October 2013. Following its release it shared the top two spots on the iTunes download chart for TV serials with following and also newly recovered serial The Web of Fear, above Homeland and Breaking Bad''.

A DVD was released in the UK on 25 November 2013. A US release arrived on 20 May 2014.

A special-edition DVD with audio commentary, interviews, a tribute to the late Deborah Watling, and further remastering of all six episodes was released in the UK on 26 March 2018, in the same year the story was set.

References

External links

Photonovel of The Enemy of the World on the BBC website
Doctor Who Locations – The Enemy of the World

Target novelisation

Second Doctor serials
1967 British television episodes
1968 British television episodes
Doctor Who serials novelised by Ian Marter
Doctor Who stories set on Earth
Television episodes set in Australia
Fiction set in 2018
Rediscovered television